The Amstel Playwright of the Year Award, an independent non-governmental prize, was launched in South Africa in 1978.  It recognised South African playwrights.  The prize was awarded to many of South Africa's anti-apartheid playwrights.

The award was discontinued in 1994.

Award Winners

Notes

References
National English Literary Museum, Grahamstown, South Africa

Awards established in 1978
Awards disestablished in 1994
South African literary awards
Dramatist and playwright awards
South African literary events
1978 establishments in South Africa